Wowaus, also known as James Printer (c. 1650-1709), was an early Nipmuc writer who helped create the first Indian Bibles in the Massachusett language (an Algonquin language), which were used by English colonists in the cultural assimilation of Native Americans.

Wowaus was the son of William Sudbury, a Christian Indian leader from Hassanemesit (today Grafton, Massachusetts). Wowaus became fluent in English as a student at an Indian charity school. He attended Harvard's Indian College and worked as an apprentice at Samuel Green's printing press, "The Cambridge Press", beginning in 1659. There, he became known by the English name, James Printer. In addition to the Indian Bible, Wowaus assisted Samuel Green in printing many of the Algonquian-language texts that were in circulation throughout the American colonies from 1658 to 1710.

In his late life, Wowaus was a teacher in Hassanemesit. His son, Ami, signed the deed that sold the last of the Hassanamesit tribal lands to the colonists in 1727.

References 

Native American writers
1650s births
1709 deaths
Year of birth uncertain
17th-century American writers
17th-century male writers
American male writers
17th-century Native Americans
17th-century American educators